Tiina Hodakov (until 1988, Tiina Tarlap; born 26 February 1969) is an Estonian rower, footballer and coach.

She was born in Pärnu. In 2002 she graduated from Tallinn Pedagogical Institute's Faculty of Physical Education.

She began his rowing career in 1981, coached by Heino Kurvet. She is 13-times Estonian champion in different rowing disciplines.

She is also played football at Pärnu women's football team. 2003-2006 the team won Estonian championships. 1996–1998 she was a member of Estonia women's national football team.

References

Living people
1939 births
Estonian female rowers
Estonian women's basketball players
Estonian sports coaches
Tallinn University alumni
Sportspeople from Pärnu